Ivan Nikolayevich Stain (born 7 February 1989) is a former Russian professional football player.

Club career
He played in the Russian Football National League for FC Nizhny Novgorod in 2009.

External links 
 
 

1989 births
Sportspeople from Yekaterinburg
Living people
Russian footballers
Association football defenders
FC Nizhny Novgorod (2007) players
FC Tranzīts players
FC Sibir Novosibirsk players
Latvian Higher League players
Russian expatriate footballers
Expatriate footballers in Latvia
Russian expatriates in Latvia
FC Tolyatti players
FC Chita players